Adèle de Pierre (1 April 1800 – 5 August 1890) was a Swiss educator and translator.

Biography
Adèle de Pierre was born 1 April 1800. She was a member of one of the leading families of Neuchâtel, then a subject state of Prussia, whose court had a tradition of employing Neuchâtelois governesses. From 1851 to 1853, de Pierre was the educator of Princess Louise of Prussia at the Berlin court. King Wilhelm I later awarded her the title of canoness of the Lutheran Order of Magdeburg.

In the 1850s, de Pierre translated the novels Uli der Knecht and Uli der Pächter by the Swiss writer Jeremias Gotthelf into French as Ulric le valet de ferme and Ulric le fermier. Gotthelf's works were popular at the Prussian court at that time.

References

1800 births
1890 deaths
Swiss writers in French
Swiss women writers
People from Neuchâtel